Te Tipua is a locality in the eastern Southland region of New Zealand's South Island.  It is west of the nearest town, Mataura, and northeast of Southland's major centre, Invercargill.  passes through Te Tipua as it runs between Waitane and its junction with State Highway 1 on the southern side of Mataura.

The main economic activities in the area relate to agriculture.  Te Tipua contains a small primary school that serves students from the surrounding area.

References 

Populated places in Southland, New Zealand